Weverson Patrick Rodrigues de Oliveira  better known as  Weverson  (born 3 June 1988) is a Brazilian football defender who has played professionally in Brazil and Europe.

Career
Born in Campina Grande, Weverson began playing football in the youth system of local side Clube Atlético Paranaense. He made his professional debut with Treze Futebol Clube, and made a move to Portuguese Primeira Liga club C.F. Os Belenenses on a three-year contract at age 19. However, he did not settle with the club and returned to Treze where he has spent the majority of his career, winning the state league and cup double in 2010 and appearing in the Copa do Brasil.

In June 2012, Weverson signed a two-year contract with Czech team SK Sigma Olomouc, but the club cancelled the contract before he officially joined the club.

Weverson played for Associação Desportiva Bahia de Feira in the 2013 Campeonato Baiano before joining Associação Cultural e Desportiva Potiguar for the 2014 Campeonato Potiguar.

Clubs
Clube Atletico Paranaense (2005–2006)
C.F. Os Belenenses (2007–2008)
Treze (2008)

Facts
Weverson is 1,86m in height and weighs 74 kg

References

External links

Profile at Globo Esporte
Profile at CBF

1988 births
Living people
Brazilian footballers
Association football defenders
Treze Futebol Clube players
Vila Nova Futebol Clube players
C.F. Os Belenenses players